Show Me is an album by Canadian alternative rock band 54-40, released in 1987. The album contains the singles "One Day in Your Life" and "One Gun", both of which were hits in the band's native country and continue to be two of the band’s most popular songs. The album was recorded in Los Angeles and according to Neil Osborne, cost $250,000 to make. The album was nominated for a CASBY Award for "Album of the Year".

Track listing
All lyrics by Neil Osborne. All music by 54-40.

 "One Day in Your Life" - 4:14
 "Get Back Down" - 4:12
 "Walk in Line" - 4:21
 "Standing in the Way" - 3:46
 "Everyday" - 4:18
 "What's in a Name" - 4:50
 "One Gun" - 4:14
 "Come Here" - 3:25
 "Because of You" - 2:53
 "Open Fire" - 3:08 (not included on original vinyl release)
 "All the Love Is Gone" - 4:42
 "Show Me" - 3:47

References

1987 albums
54-40 albums
Warner Records albums